Mycobacterium parascrofulaceum is a species of Mycobacterium.

References

External links
Type strain of Mycobacterium parascrofulaceum at BacDive -  the Bacterial Diversity Metadatabase

parascrofulaceum